Someone, Somewhere is a 2019 French comedy film directed by Cédric Klapisch, starring François Civil and Ana Girardot. The film premiered at the 2019 Festival du Film Francophone d'Angoulême (FFA).

Synopsis
Rémy (François Civil), who has an unskilled job, and Mélanie (Ana Girardot), who works in scientific research, are two thirty-year-old Parisians at the mercy of a depressive mood. Victims of the loneliness of the metropolis, they try in vain to meet someone somewhere, especially on social media, even if they live right on the same floor of two terraced houses. Both undergo psychotherapy and thus embark on a path that will lead them in the same direction.

Cast
 François Civil as Rémy Pelletier
 Ana Girardot as Mélanie Brunet
 François Berléand as J.B. Meyer (Rémy's psychologist)
 Camille Cottin as Mélanie's psychologist
 Simon Abkarian as Mansour
 Eye Haïdara as Djena
 Virginie Hocq as The pharmacist

Production
Both leads were already present in the director's previous film, Back to Burgundy (2017).

Release
The film had its world premiere at the Festival du Film Francophone d'Angoulême on 21 August 2019. It was released in theaters starting in France on 11 September 2019, and on VOD by Distrib Films on 6 October 2020.

Reception

Box office
Someone, Somewhere grossed an unknown amount in North America and $5.5 million worldwide.

Critical response
, all of the eight critical reviews compiled on Rotten Tomatoes are positive, with an average rating of 7.9/10.

References

External links

2019 films
2019 comedy films
French comedy films
2010s French-language films
Films about psychoanalysis
Films set in Paris
Films shot in Paris
2010s French films